Olga Masilionene (born 25 January 1980 in Minsk, Soviet Union) is a Belarusian basketball player who competed in the 2008 Summer Olympics.

References

1980 births
Living people
Basketball players from Minsk
Belarusian women's basketball players
Shooting guards
ŽKK Gospić players
Olympic basketball players of Belarus
Basketball players at the 2008 Summer Olympics